April Ferry (born October 31, 1932) is a costume designer. She was nominated at the 67th Academy Awards for the film Maverick in the category of Best Costume Design.

She won an Emmy Award for the costumes in the TV show Rome. She was also nominated for an Emmy in 1989 for the Hallmark movie My Name Is Bill W..

In 2014, April received the Career Achievement Award at the Costume Designers Guild Awards.

In 2016, starting with season 6 of HBO's epic fantasy series Game of Thrones, she took over Michele Clapton's duties as the new costume designer for a majority of the season. Clapton eventually returned to the show as costume designer for the seventh season.

She has over 45 credits, including a couple of films from the TV show The Rockford Files.

Selected filmography

Jurassic World (2015)
Robocop (2014)
Elysium (2013)
Terminator 3: Rise of the Machines (2003)
Donnie Darko (2001)
U-571 (2000)
Don King: Only in America (1997)
Flubber (1997)
Shadow Conspiracy (1997)
Maverick (1994)
Little Giants (1994)
Beethoven's 2nd (1993)
Free Willy (1993)
The Babe (1992)
Radio Flyer (1992)
Almost an Angel (1990)
Leviathan (1989)
Three Fugitives (1989)
Made in Heaven (1988)
Planes, Trains & Automobiles (1987)
Big Trouble in Little China (1986)
Mask (1985)
The Jerk (1979)

References

External links

1932 births
American costume designers
Women costume designers
Living people
People from North Carolina
Emmy Award winners